The 1st Grenadier Division was a grenadier unit in the Imperial Russian Army. It was headquartered at Moscow and participated in the Baranovichi Offensive.

Organization 
 1st Brigade
 2nd Brigade
 Artillery Brigade

Commanders 
 1854–1855: Alexander Gildenshtubbe
 1875–1878: Christopher Roop
 1891–1898: Vodar

Chiefs of Staff 
 1891–1895: Alexander G Sandetsky
 1902–1904: Pantalejmon Simanski
 1915–1917: Vladimir Yegoryev

Commanders of the 1st Brigade 
 1845–1848: Alexander Gildenshtubbe
 1913–1914:

Commanders of the 2nd Brigade 
 1831–1832: Mikhail Grigoryevich Brajko
 1878–1881: Mikhail Batyanov
 1890–1894: Grigory Vasilyevich Kryukov
 1905: Vladimir Gorbatovsky

Commanders of the Artillery Brigade 
 1907–1908: Nikolai Ilyich Bulatov

References

Infantry divisions of the Russian Empire
Moscow Governorate